Cannabis in Namibia is illegal for recreational and medicinal uses, but cannabis, just like mandrax (methaqualone), are the most popular illicit drugs in the country. Cannabis also has a history of use as a traditional medicine by local indigenous communities. Per the 2011 UNODC report, the incidence of annual cannabis usage in Namibia was 3.9% as of 2000.

Terminology
The term dagga or dakha ("grass") is common for cannabis, with a cannabis cigarette termed a zol or joint.

Laws and policies
The "Abuse of Dependence-Producing Substances and Rehabilitation Centres Act of 1971" is the law currently in force in Namibia, supplemented by the "Combatting of the Abuse of Drugs Bill" of 2006 which increased penalties to prison sentences of between 20 and 40 years (alternative to incarceration includes a fine of between N$300,000 and N$500,000), even for first-time drug offense, regardless of drug type or quantity. At the time of adoption of that bill, protests were raised against the proposal, particularly by Namibia's artistic and creative communities, and followers of the Rastafarian faith.

Possible cannabis law reforms
Following a proposal filed in June 2020 by the non-profits Ganja Users of Namibia (GUN) and Rastafari United Front (RUF), a governmental task force was established to consult on the eventual regulation and controlled use of cannabis in Namibia, including a public consultation process open from 12 to 22 November 2020 convened by the Ministry of Health and Social Services. 

The Cannabis and Hemp Association of Namibia (CHAN) was constituted, with support from the Dagga Couple of neighbouring South Africa, to further represent voices of the communities of people who use or grow cannabis and hemp in the country. 

In September 2021, GUN and RUF filed a lawsuit against the Ministers of justice, and of health and social services, as well as other country officials, asking "for their own rights to use dagga, to challenge the constitutionality of all laws prohibiting dagga in Namibia."

References

Namibia
Drugs in Namibia